Writer is a 2021 Indian Tamil-language crime thriller film written and directed by debutant Franklin Jacob and produced by Neelam Productions in association with Golden Ratio Films, Little Red Car Films and Jetty Productions. The film stars Samuthirakani and Hari Krishnan, and the music is composed by Govind Vasantha. The film was released in theatres on 24 December 2021 and received positive reviews from critics.

Synopsis 

A writer at a police station gets trapped in an illegal custody case involving an innocent Ph.D. student. With his guilt and regret looming large, can he save the young man?

Plot 

The movie opens with a new recruit police constable Arivazhagan (Dileepan) reporting for duty at Tiruverumbur police station, in Tiruchirappalli. He is taken under wing by Head constable Thangaraj (Samuthirakani), who works as a writer at the station. Thangaraj is shown to be a bigamist, and it is later revealed that he was forced into the second marriage with a much younger girl, to bear an offspring. Thangaraj had initiated and is still continuing to fight a case, for the establishment of a police union, for voicing the opinions of lower rank police officers. This does not go well with the Inspector of the police (Bose Venkat), who has him transferred to Thiruvallikeni police station in Chennai, as a punishment.

Once there, Thangaraj is assigned menial duties within the station and befriends an ex-convict, Raja, whom Thangaraj had known from a previous case. Raja does odd jobs and is shown to stay within the station premises. On his first day, Thangaraj is assigned to watch over a PhD student Devakumar (Hari Krishnan), held in illegal custody in a marriage hall nearby. Devakumar tries to escape initially, but gets caught by Thangaraj and the manager of the marriage hall. The police personnel in the station don't seem to take any interest in revealing the details of the case. The police inspector Perumal and another head constable Manickam, force Devakumar to sign some documents.

Devakumar is constantly shifted to various lodges, and the Deputy Commissioner Trivedi Sharma is also shown to be involved in the case. Raja and Thangaraj go to watch over Devakumar, and he sobbingly shares his story to Raja. Devakumar belongs to a backward community, living with his elder brother Xavier (Subramaniam Siva), his sister-in-law and their son, in Thirukkattupalli town, near Trichy. After a spat in the house, he heads back to Chennai. Pretty soon, he is shown to be detained by the police, who also take his cellphone away. A senior journalist in Trichy, whom Thangaraj has been pursuing to write about the police union case, publishes this illegal detention as a scoop, after Thangaraj unintentionally reveals it to him.

Trivedi Sharma becomes livid, and has Thangaraj write a crime scene to implicate Devakumar, not knowing it was Thangaraj who leaked the story. It also shown that Thangaraj was previously acquainted with him. Devakumar gets implicated as a Naxalite and is arrested. Thangaraj feels guilty for having caused this. Xavier comes to Chennai to meet his brother. Thangaraj explains to him the seriousness of the situation and asks him to approach a lawyer Marudhamuthu (G. M. Sundar), to help out in the case. Marudhamuthu learns that the police are very secretive about the case and is not allowed an audience with Devakumar.

Trivedi Sharma, Inspector Perumal and head constable Manickam ask Devakumar why he wanted 'those details' and beat him up. Marudhamuthu learns of this and rushes back to the police station with Xavier and manages to convince Perumal to allow Xavier to meet his brother. Thangaraj reveals to Marudhamuthu about his role in Devakumar's arrest. He secretly smuggles a phone into Devakumar's cell to allow him to speak with Marudhamuthu. It is then shown that Devakumar is doing PhD in Sociology, from Madras University. He was researching about mental health of police officers and increasing numbers of death by suicide, in the police force.

He had contacted a lawyer Anwar, in Saidapet court, who filed an RTI to get him the information for his thesis. In a flashback, it is revealed that Trivedi Sharma had rejected three applications for the joining the horse riding team of Tamil Nadu Police force, one of which belongs to Saranya (Ineya). She is told by an officer that she was rejected because of her caste certificate. When Saranya questions this, she is forced to do stable maintenance duty by Sharma. One day, when Sharma visits the stables, she adamantly rides a horse in front of him, which angers him and he beats her up badly, and she commits suicide soon after.

Thangaraj becomes remorseful after hearing this and plots along with Arivazhagan to help Devakumar escape and surrender in a court, under a different case, thus escaping the police officers who want him silenced. After facing many hurdles, Thangaraj helps Devakumar run away. A few months later, Thangaraj is shown to be in jail. In a letter to Arivazhagan, he reveals what happened after he helped Devakumar run away. Thangaraj is hit on the head by one of his pursuers and is hospitalized, Sharma, Perumal and Manickam trace and abduct Devakumar. A guilt-ridden Thangaraj is forced to shoot him dead. Later, when Sharma, Perumal and Manickam try and convince Thangaraj to finish the case, writing it off as an encounter of a criminal trying to escape, Thangaraj refuses to cooperate and says he will reveal the truth, thereby leading to the implication of the other three. When Sharma threatens to shoot him, Thangaraj snatches the gun and shoots Sharma dead, in front of a shocked Perumal and Manickam. Thangaraj asks forgiveness from Xavier for causing his brother's death. After reading the letter, Arivazhagan is shown to continue fighting the police union case, heeding Thangaraj's request.

Cast

Soundtrack 

The soundtrack and score is composed by Govind Vasantha and the album featured two songs. The audio rights were acquired by Think Music.

Release 
The film was released in theatres on 24 December 2021 and opened to positive reviews.

Home Media 
The post-theatrical streaming rights of the film were bought by Aha and will be premiered on 11 February 2022. The satellite rights of the film were sold to Colors Tamil.

Reception 
Ashameera Aiyappan of Firstpost rated the film with 3.5/5 stars, stating that, "Writer depicts an honest policeman’s mental health struggle like no other film- the introspection is real and honest." Behindwoods rated the film with 3/5 stars, stating that "Writer is a solid political film, that shows the weaker side of police deparment." Logesh Balachandran of The Times of India gave a rating of 3 out on 5 and wrote, "Writer definitely has honest intentions and is watchable for the subject it has dealt with." Sudhir Srinivasan of Cinema Express gave a rating of 3 out on 5 and wrote, "the film has many interesting ideas, but not quite a riveting film."

Sify rated the film with 3/5 stars, stating that "Writer sends a much-needed message to the Government and the superior officers in the Police Force. Will they listen?" and gave the verdict as "A honest take on the corrupt police department." Haricharan Pudipeddi of Hindustan Times stated that, "Writer is the kind of film that goes beyond the meaning of entertainment, and it leaves you enlightened. It makes you question the very department that’s meant to protect us and be at our service." Srinivasa Ramanujam of The Hindu wrote, "With the drama-thriller, debutant director Franklin Jacob joins the long list of exciting Tamil filmmakers to watch out for." Bharathy Singaravel of The News Minute stated that, "Releasing in mainstream venues, in the same theatres that run big budget cop films to full houses, this film helps spread a political language tuned to the systemic failures in this country. Writer is a film you don’t want to miss."

References

External links 
 

2021 drama films
Films scored by Govind Vasantha